Samuel Carlson (born December 3, 1998) is an American professional baseball pitcher in the Seattle Mariners organization.

Amateur career
Carlson attended Burnsville High School in Burnsville, Minnesota. During his senior year, Carlson had a jump in velocity, going from the 88–92 range to 93–97. He posted a 0.93 ERA (9th in state and 2nd on Burnsville) and 53 strikeouts (28th in state) over 34 innings, and was named Minnesota Mr. Baseball. He committed to the University of Florida to play college baseball.

Professional career
Carlson was selected in the second round of the 2017 Major League Baseball draft by the Seattle Mariners. He signed with the Mariners for $2 million. He made his professional debut with the Arizona League Mariners, pitching only three innings before being shut down due to minor elbow discomfort.

Heading into the 2018 season, Carlson was named Seattle's third ranked prospect and the top pitching prospect in the organization, but had elbow discomfort return during the Mariners mini-camp in February and was shut down again. He was given a PRP injection and eventually started rehabbing, but a setback in his rehab forced him to undergo Tommy John surgery on July 2, causing him to miss the rest of 2018 and all of the 2019 season. Carlson returned healthy in 2020, but did not play a game after the minor league season was cancelled due to the COVID-19 pandemic. For the 2021 season, he was assigned to the Modesto Nuts, with whom he started 19 games and went 6-4 with a 4.77 ERA and 112 strikeouts over 100 innings.

References

External links

1998 births
Living people
People from Savage, Minnesota
Baseball players from Minnesota
Baseball pitchers
Arizona League Mariners players
Sportspeople from the Minneapolis–Saint Paul metropolitan area